HMS Squirrel was a turbine-powered  built for the Royal Navy during the Second World War. She was scuttled after striking a mine in 1945.

Design and description
The ships' complement consisted of 85 officers and ratings.

The ships had two Parsons geared steam turbines, each driving one shaft, using steam provided by two Admiralty three-drum boilers.

The Algerine class was armed with a QF  Mk V anti-aircraft gun and four twin-gun mounts for Oerlikon 20 mm cannon. The latter guns were in short supply when the first ships were being completed and they often got a proportion of single mounts. By 1944, single-barrel Bofors 40 mm mounts began replacing the twin 20 mm mounts on a one for one basis. All of the ships were fitted for four throwers and two rails for depth charges.

Construction and career
She was launched in 1944. Squirrel took part in minesweeping operations off the west coast of the Malay peninsula on 24 July 1945. Squirrel hit a mine off Phuket Island during the attack, and caught fire. After a half hour the flames were beyond control and she was abandoned. She was scuttled by gunfire two hours later. Seven men were lost in the attack.

References

Bibliography

External links
HMS Squirrel at uboat.net
 HMS Squirrel at naval.history.net

 

1944 ships
Ships sunk by mines
Maritime incidents in July 1945
Algerine-class minesweepers of the Royal Navy
World War II shipwrecks in the Indian Ocean
Ships built in Belfast
Ships built by Harland and Wolff